Debdeep Mukhopadhyay is an Indian cryptographer and professor at the Department of Computer Science and Engineering of the Indian Institute of Technology Kharagpur. He was awarded the  Shanti Swarup Bhatnagar Award for Science and Technology, the highest science award in India, in 2021 for his contributions to micro-architectural security and cryptographic engineering. Debdeep Mukhopadhyay's research interests include Hardware security, Cryptographic Engineering, Design Automation of Cryptosystems, VLSI of Cryptosystems, and Cryptography. He has authored several textbooks, including  Cryptography and network security , which has been cited 1227 times, according to Google Scholar. He was elevated to the Fellow of Indian National Academy of Engineers in 2021.

Early life, education and academic career 
Debdeep Mukhopadhyay was born on 31 October 1977 in Howrah, a twin town of Kolkata. He completed his B.Tech from the Indian Institute of Technology Kharagpur in 2001. He completed his M.S. and Ph.D. from the same institute in 2004 and 2007, respectively. His PhD thesis was awarded the Techno-Inventor Award (Best PhD Award) by the Indian Semiconductors Association in 2008. He served as an assistant professor at the Department of Computer Science and Engineering, Indian Institute of Technology Madras between 2007 and 2008. He joined the Department of Computer Science and Engineering, Indian Institute of Technology Kharagpur as an assistant professor in 2008 and is currently a professor.

He also served as a visiting faculty at the Polytechnic Institute of New York University, Brooklyn, USA, visiting scientist at the CYSREN, School of Computer Science and Engineering of Nanyang Technological University, Singapore, and visiting associate professor at the Department of Computer Science of New York University Shanghai, China.

Awards and recognition 

 2021 Khosla National Award (Engineering)
 2021 Shanti Swarup Bhatnagar Award for Science & Technology
 2018 Data Security Council of India (DSCI) Excellence Award for Cyber Security Education
 2015-16 Department of Science and Technology (India) Swarnajayanti Award
 2012 Associate for the Indian Academy of Sciences
 2010 Indian National Academy of Engineers (INAE) Young Engineer Award
 2010 Indian National Science Academy (INSA) Young Scientist Award

Books 

 Cryptography and Network Security, McGraw Hill Education
Hardware Security: Design, Threats, and Safeguards, Chapman and Hall/CRC
Timing Channels in Cryptography - A Micro-Architectural Perspective, Springer
Fault Tolerant Architectures for Cryptography and Hardware Security, Springer

References

External links 

 Departmental Webpage
Personal Webpage
 DBLP

Academic staff of IIT Kharagpur
IIT Kharagpur alumni
Recipients of the Shanti Swarup Bhatnagar Award in Engineering Science
Fellows of the Indian National Academy of Engineering
Fellows of the Indian Academy of Sciences
Fellows of the Indian National Science Academy
Living people
Year of birth missing (living people)
Engineers from West Bengal